James Rosen (October 23, 1909 – November 18, 1972) was a United States circuit judge of the United States Court of Appeals for the Third Circuit.

Education and career

Born in Brooklyn, New York, Rosen received a Bachelor of Laws from Newark Law School (now Rutgers Law School) in 1930. He was in private practice in Union City, New Jersey from 1931 to 1959. He was a judge of Hudson County, New Jersey from 1959 to 1964, and then on the New Jersey Superior Court from 1964 to 1971.

Federal judicial service

On July 19, 1971, Rosen was nominated by President Richard Nixon to a seat on the United States Court of Appeals for the Third Circuit vacated by Judge William H. Hastie. He was confirmed by the United States Senate on September 21, 1971, and received his commission on September 22, 1971. Rosen served in that capacity until his death on November 18, 1972, in West New York, New Jersey.

References

Sources
 

1909 births
1972 deaths
People from West New York, New Jersey
New Jersey state court judges
Judges of the United States Court of Appeals for the Third Circuit
United States court of appeals judges appointed by Richard Nixon
20th-century American judges
People from Brooklyn
Rutgers School of Law–Newark alumni
20th-century American lawyers